The Mid-Atlantic Apiculture Research and Extension Consortium (MAAREC), established in 1997, is a regional group focused on addressing the pest management crisis facing the beekeeping industry in the Mid-Atlantic region of the United States.  A task force has been established with representation from the departments of agriculture, state beekeeping organizations, and land-grant universities from each of the following states: New Jersey, Maryland, Delaware, Pennsylvania and West Virginia.

MAAREC has been researching alternatives to chemical controls and promotion of less reliance on chemical pesticides for mite control.  MAAREC's Colony Collapse Disorder Working Group is investigating colony collapse disorder.

References

Further reading
Beekeeping Basics: MAAREC, (Google Books), By Clarence H. Collison, Maryann Frazier, Dewey Maurice Caron, Ann Harmon, and Dennis Van Englesdorp
Honey Bees: Estimating the Environmental Impact of Chemicals, (Google Books), By James Devillers, Minh-Hà Pham-Delègue

Organizations established in 1997
Beekeeping organizations
Organizations based in Delaware
College and university associations and consortia in the United States
Beekeeping in the United States
Agricultural organizations based in the United States
1997 establishments in the United States